Leutnant Erich Thomas was a World War I German flying ace credited with ten aerial victories. Nine of these were observation balloons he destroyed.

Balloon buster

Thomas was assigned to Jagdstaffel 9 in December 1917. He shot down his first enemy observation balloon on 3 January 1918. He carried on his career as a balloon buster for Jasta 9 through 16 March 1918, when he downed numbers seven and eight. He then transferred to Jagdstaffel 22, and shot down a ninth balloon on 21 March, and a Sopwith on the 22nd. On 23 March, he attacked another French balloon and was shot down by Jean Chaput, Marcel Haegelen, and Auguste Lahoulle. Thomas was taken prisoner of war.

Sources of information

References
Above the Lines: The Aces and Fighter Units of the German Air Service, Naval Air Service and Flanders Marine Corps 1914 - 1918 Norman L. R. Franks, et al. Grub Street, 1993. , .

1897 births
1960 deaths
German World War I flying aces
Military personnel from Essen
Recipients of the Iron Cross (1914), 1st class